The 1976 Mississippi State Bulldogs football team represented Mississippi State University during the 1976 NCAA Division I football season. The team was led by head coach Bob Tyler, competed as a member of the Southeastern Conference and finished the season with an overall record of nine wins and two losses (9–2, 4–2 SEC). However, in May 1978, the NCAA ruled Mississippi State to forfeit all nine victories due to having played an ineligible player.

Schedule

Personnel

References

Mississippi State
Mississippi State Bulldogs football seasons
Mississippi State Bulldogs football